Let Me Be the One may refer to:

 Let Me Be the One (album), a 1984 album by Angela Bofill
 "Let Me Be the One" (Angela Bofill song), 1984
 "Let Me Be the One" (The Carpenters song), 1971
 "Let Me Be the One" (Exposé song), 1987
 "Let Me Be the One" (Five Star song), 1985
 "Let Me Be the One" (Hank Locklin song), 1953
 "Let Me Be the One" (The Shadows song), 1975
 "Let Me Be the One" (Sasha song), 2000
 "Let Me Be the One", a song by Blessid Union of Souls from Home
 "Let Me Be the One", a song by Kevin Costner & Modern West
 "Let Me Be the One", a song by Quiet Riot from Guilty Pleasures
 "Let Me Be the One", a song by Six
 "Let Me Be the One", a song by Nicolette Larson from her 1988 album Shadows of Love
 "Let Me Be the One", B-side of "I Wanna Be with You" by Mandy Moore (2000)